Evelyn Nazarena Bermúdez (born 1 April 1996) is an Argentine professional boxer. She has held the IBF female junior flyweight title since 2018 and as of September 2020, is ranked as the world's fourth best active female junior flyweight by The Ring and sixth by BoxRec. She is the younger sister of former three-division world champion of boxing, Daniela Romina Bermúdez.

Professional career
Bermúdez made her professional debut on 22 October 2016, scoring a four-round unanimous decision (UD) victory against Adriana Moldonado at the Estadio cubierto Sub sede Cruce Alberdi in Rosario, Argentina. 

After compiling a record of 9–0 (2 KOs), she defeated Vanesa Lorena Taborda on 28 September 2018 at the Olimpico Football Club in Villa Gobernador Gálvez, Argentina, capturing the vacant South American super flyweight title via UD with the scorecards reading 100–90, 100–91.5 and 100–93.

Her next fight came three months later on 29 December, moving down two weight classes to challenge IBF female junior flyweight champion Guadalupe Bautista at the Club Atlético Talleres in Villa Gobernador Gálvez. Bermúdez defeated Bautista via split decision (SD) to capture her first world title, with two judges scoring the bout 96–94 in favour of Bermúdez while the third scored it 96–94 to Bautista. Bermúdez' sister, Daniela, also became a world champion on the same card, winning the WBO female bantamweight title.

Professional boxing record (Incomplete)

References

Living people
1996 births
Argentine women boxers
Sportspeople from Santa Fe Province
Light-flyweight boxers
Super-flyweight boxers
International Boxing Federation champions